Stictea mygindiana is a moth belonging to the family Tortricidae. The species was first described by Michael Denis and Ignaz Schiffermüller in 1775.

It is native to Europe.

The wingspan is 15-20mm. The ground colour of the forewings is warm brownish-red, with silvery cross stripes and a brown-red mesh pattern. The hindwings are brownish-white.

The larvae feed on Vaccinium vitis-idaea, Arctostaphylos uva-ursi and  Myrica gale. The species flies in May-June on moors and in coniferous forests where these plants grow.

References

Olethreutini